Sacred prostitution, temple prostitution, cult prostitution, and religious prostitution are purported rites consisting of paid intercourse performed in the context of religious worship, possibly as a form of fertility rite or divine marriage. Scholars prefer the terms "sacred sex" or "sacred sexual rites" in cases where payment for services is not involved.

The historicity of literal sacred prostitution, particularly in some places and periods, is a controversial topic within the academic world. Historically mainstream historiography has considered it a probable reality, based on the abundance of ancient sources and chroniclers detailing its practices, although it has proved harder to differentiate between true prostitution and sacred sex without remuneration. Authors have also interpreted evidence as secular prostitution administered in the temple under the patronage of fertility deities, not as an act of religious worship by itself. However, scholarship in the 21st century has challenged the veracity of sacred prostitution as a concept, suggesting that the claims are based on mistranslations, misunderstandings or outright inventions of ancient authors.

Definitions 
Sacred prostitution has many different characteristics depending on the region, class and the religious ideals of the period and the place, and consequently can have many different definitions. One definition that was developed was due to the common types of sacred prostitution that are recorded in Classical sources: sale of a woman’s virginity or rinni in honor of a goddess or a once-in-a-lifetime prostitution, professional prostitutes or slaves owned by a temple or sanctuary, and temporary prostitution that occurs before a marriage or during certain rituals. Stephanie Budin offers her own definition while trying to argue that sacred prostitution never existed: “Sacred prostitution is the sale of a person's body for sexual purposes where some portion (if not all) of the money or goods received for this transaction belongs to a deity”.

Ancient Near East

Ancient Near Eastern societies along the Tigris and Euphrates rivers featured many shrines and temples or houses of heaven dedicated to various deities. The 5th-century BC historian Herodotus's account and some other testimony from the Hellenistic Period and Late Antiquity suggest that ancient societies encouraged the practice of sacred sexual rites not only in Babylonia and Cyprus, but throughout the Near East.

The work of gender researchers like Daniel Arnaud, Julia Assante and Stephanie Budin has cast the whole tradition of scholarship that defined the concept of sacred prostitution into doubt. Budin regards the concept of sacred prostitution as a myth, arguing taxatively that the practices described in the sources were misunderstandings of either non-remunerated ritual sex or non-sexual religious ceremonies, or possibly even invented as rhetorical devices.

Sumer
Through the twentieth century, scholars generally believed that a form of sacred marriage rite (hieros gamos) was staged between the kings in the ancient Near Eastern region of Sumer and the high priestesses of Inanna, the Sumerian goddess of sexual love, fertility, and warfare, later called Ishtar. The king would couple with the priestess to represent the union of Dumuzid with Inanna. According to the noted Assyriologist Samuel Noah Kramer, the kings would further establish their legitimacy by taking part in a ritual sexual act in the temple of the fertility goddess Ishtar every year on the tenth day of the New Year festival Akitu.

However, no certain evidence has survived to prove that sexual intercourse was included, despite many popular descriptions of the habit. It is possible that these unions never occurred but were embellishments to the image of the king; hymns which praise Ancient Near Eastern kings for coupling with the goddess Ishtar often speak of them as running , offering sacrifices, feasting with the sun-god Utu, and receiving a royal crown from An, all in a single day. Some modern historians argue in the same direction, though their posture has been disputed.

Babylonia
According to Herodotus, the rites performed at these temples included sexual intercourse, or what scholars later called sacred sexual rites:

The British anthropologist James Frazer accumulated citations to prove this in a chapter of his magnum opus The Golden Bough (1890–1915), and this has served as a starting point for several generations of scholars. Frazer and Henriques distinguished two major forms of sacred sexual rites: temporary rite of unwed girls (with variants such as dowry-sexual rite, or as public defloration of a bride), and lifelong sexual rite. However, Frazer took his sources mostly from authors of Late Antiquity (i.e. 150–500 AD), not from the Classical or Hellenistic periods. This raises questions as to whether the phenomenon of temple sexual rites can be generalized to the whole of the ancient world, as earlier scholars typically did.

In Hammurabi's code of laws, the rights and good name of female sacred sexual priestesses were protected. The same legislation that protected married women from slander applied to them and their children. They could inherit property from their fathers, collect income from land worked by their brothers, and dispose of property. These rights have been described as extraordinary, taking into account the role of women at the time.

Terms associated with temple prostitution in Sumeria and Babylonia
All translations are sourced from the Pennsylvania Sumerian Dictionary.  Akkadian terms were used in the Akkadian Empire, Assyria, and Babylonia.  The terms themselves come from lexical profession lists on tablets dating back to the Early Dynastic period.

Notes on the cuneiform: by convention Akkadian is italicized, spoken Sumerian is lowercase and cuneiform sign transliteration is uppercase.  In addition, a determinative sign is written as a superscript.  Determinatives are only written and never spoken.  In spoken sumerian homophones are distinguished by a numerical subscript.

Hittites
The Hittites practiced sacred prostitution as part of a cult of deities, including the worship of a mated pair of deities, a bull god and a lion goddess, while in later days it was the mother-goddess who became prominent, representing fertility, and (in Phoenicia) the goddess who presided over human birth.

Phoenicia
It has been argued that sacred prostitution, worked by both males and females, was a custom of ancient Phoenicians. It would be dedicated to the deities Astarte and Adonis, and sometimes performed as a festival or social rite in the cities of Byblos, Afqa and Baalbek (later named Heliopolis) as well as the nearby Syrian city of Palmyra.

At the Etruscan site of Pyrgi, a center of worship of the eastern goddess Astarte, archaeologists identified a temple consecrated to her and built with at least 17 small rooms that may have served as quarters for temple prostitutes. Similarly, a temple dedicated to her equated goddess Atargatis in Dura-Europos, was found with nearly a dozen small rooms with low benches, which might have used either for sacred meals or sacred services of women jailed in the temple for adultery. Pyrgi's sacred prostitutes were famous enough to be apparently mentioned in a lost fragment of Lucilius's works.

In northern Africa, the area of influence of the Phoenician colony of Carthage, this service was associated to the city of Sicca, a nearby city that received the name of Sicca Veneria for its temple of Astarte or Tanit (called Venus by Roman authors). Valerius Maximus describe how their women gained gifts by engaging in prostitution with visitors.

Phoenicio-Punic settlements in Hispania, like Cancho Roano, Gadir, Castulo and La Quéjola, have suggested this practice through their archaeology and iconography. In particular, Cancho Roano features a sanctuary built with multiple cells or rooms, which has been identified as a possible place of sacred prostitution in honor to Astarte. A similar institution might have been found in Gadir. Its posterior, renowned erotic dancers called puellae gaditanae in Roman sources (or cinaedi in the case of male dancers) might have been desecrated heirs of this practice, considering the role occupied by sex and dance on Phoenician culture.

Another center of cult to Astarte was Cyprus, whose main temples were located in Paphos, Amathus and Kition. The epigraphy of the Kition temple describes personal economic activity on the temple, as sacred prostitution would have been taxed as any other occupation, and names possible practitioners as grm (male) and lmt (female).

Hebrew Bible
The Hebrew Bible uses two different words for prostitute, zonah (זונה)‎ and kedeshah (or qedesha) (קדשה)‎. The word zonah simply meant an ordinary prostitute or loose woman. But the word kedeshah literally means set apart (in feminine form), from the Semitic root Q-D-Sh (קדש)‎ meaning holy, consecrated or set apart. Nevertheless, zonah and qedeshah are not interchangeable terms: the former occurs 93 times in the Bible, whereas the latter is only used in three places, conveying different connotations.

This double meaning has led to the belief that kedeshah were not ordinary prostitutes, but sacred harlots who worked out of fertility temples. However, the lack of solid evidence has indicated that the word might refer to prostitutes who offered their services in the vicinity of temples, where they could attract a larger number of clients. The term might have originated as consecrated maidens employed in Canaanite and Phoenician temples, which became synonymous with harlotry for Biblical writers.

In any case, the translation of sacred prostitute has continued, however, because it explains how the word can mean such disparate concepts as sacred and prostitute. As put by DeGrado, "neither the interpretation of the קדשה as a "priestess-not-prostitute" (according to Westenholz) nor as a "prostitute-not-priestess" (according to Gruber) adequately represents the semantic range of Hebrew word in biblical and post-biblical Hebrew."

Male prostitutes were called kadesh or qadesh (literally: male who is set apart). The Hebrew word kelev (dog) may also signify a male dancer or prostitute.

The Law of Moses (Deuteronomy) was not universally observed in Hebrew culture under the rule of King David's dynasty, as recorded in Kings.  In fact Judah had lost "the Book of the Law". During the reign of King Josiah, the high priest Hilkiah discovers it in "the House of the Lord" and realizes that the people have disobeyed, particularly regarding prostitution.

Ancient Greece and Hellenistic world

Ancient Greece

The Greek term hierodoulos or hierodule has sometimes been taken to mean sacred holy woman, but it is more likely to refer to a former slave freed from slavery in order to be dedicated to a god.

There were different levels of prostitutes within Ancient Greece society, but two categories are specifically related to sacred or temple prostitution. The first category are hetaires, also known as courtesans, typically more educated women that served within temples. The second category are known as hierodoules, slave women or female priests who worked within temples and served the sexual requests of visitors to the temple.

While there may not be a direct connection between temples and prostitution, many prostitutes and courtesans worshipped Aphrodite, the goddess of love. Prostitutes would use their earnings to pay for dedications and ritualistic celebrations in honor of Aphrodite. Some prostitutes also viewed the action of sexual service and sexual pleasure as an act of devotion to the goddess of love, worshipping Aphrodite through an act rather than a physical dedication.

In the temple of Apollo at Bulla Regia, a woman was found buried with an inscription reading: "Adulteress. Prostitute. Seize (me), because I fled from Bulla Regia." It has been speculated she might be a woman forced into sacred prostitution as a punishment for adultery.

Temple(s) of Aphrodite 
The act of sacred prostitution within the Temples of Aphrodite in the city of Corinth was well-known and well-spread. Greek writer-philosopher Strabo comments, “the Temple of Aphrodite was so rich that it owned a thousand temple-slaves, courtesans, whom both men and women had dedicated to the goddess”. Within the same work, Strabo compares Corinth to the city of Comana, confirming the belief that temple prositution was a notable characteristic of Corinth.

Prostitutes performed sacred functions within the temple of Aphrodite. They would often burn incense in honor of Aphrodite. Chameleon of Heracleia recorded in his book, “On Pindar”, that whenever the city of Corinth prayed to Aphrodite in manners of great importance, many prostitutes were invited to participate in the prayers and petitions.

The girls involved in temple prostitution were typically slaves owned by the temple. However, some of the girls were gifted to the temple from other members of society in return for success in particular endeavors. One example that shows the gifting of girls to the temple is the poem of Athenaeus, which explores an athlete Xenophon’s actions of gifting a group of courtesans to Aphrodite as a thanks-offering for his victory in a competition.

Specifically in 464 BC, Xenophon was victorious in the Olympic Games and donated 100 slaves to Aphrodite’s temple. Pindar, a famous Greek poet, was commissioned to write a poem that was to be performed at Xenophon’s victory celebration in Corinth. The poet acknowledged that the slaves would serve Aphrodite as sacred prostitutes within her temple at Corinth.

Another temple of Aphrodite was named Aphrodite Melainis, located near the city gates in an area known as “Craneion”. It is the resting place of Lais, who was a famous prostitute in Greek history. This suggests that there was a connection with ritual prostitution within temples of Aphrodite.

There is a report that was found of an epigram of Simonides commemorating the prayer of the prostitutes of Corinth on behalf of the salvation of the Greeks from the invading Persians in early fifth century BCE. Both temple prostitutes and priestesses prayed to Aphrodite for help, and were honored for their potent prayers, which Greek citizens believed contributed to the repelling of the Persians.

Athenaeus also alludes to the idea that many of Aphrodite’s temples and sanctuaries were occupied by temple prostitutes. These prostitutes were known to practice sexual rituals in different cities which included Corinth, Magnesia, and Samos.

Signs of Sacred Prostitution within Minoan Crete 
Some evidence of sacred prostitution was evident in Minoan Crete. The building in question is known as the “East Building”, but was also referred to as “the House of the Ladies” by the excavator of the building. Some believe that the architecture of this building seemed to reflect the grooming needs of women, but could also have been a brothel for high status individuals.

The structure of the interior of the building seemed to suggest that the building was used for prostitution. Large clay vats typically used for bathing were found within the building, along with successive doors within the corridors. The successive doors suggested privacy, and within the time period, was associated with two functions: storage of valuable goods and protection of the private moments of its residents. Because the ground floors were found practically empty, the possibility that the building was used for prostitution increases.

There were also religious embellishments found within the “East Building”, such as vases and other vessels that seemed to be connected to religious rituals. The vessels were covered in motifs related to sacrilegious rituals, such as the sacral knot and the image of birds flying freely. The functions of the vessels would have been offering food or liquid in relation to the rituals. Combining these two factors together, it is a possibility that sacred prostitution existed within this building.

Hellenistic world
In the Greek-influenced and colonized world, "sacred prostitution" was known in Cyprus (Greek-settled since 1100 BC), Sicily (Hellenized since 750 BC), in the Kingdom of Pontus (8th century BC) and in Cappadocia (c. 330 BC hellenized).  describes sacred prostitution in the Hebrew temple under the reign of the Hellenistic ruler Antiochus IV Epiphanes.

Cyprus 
A passage in Herodotus explains a Babylonian custom where before marriage, girls had to offer themselves for sex, presumably within a temple, as required by rites of a goddess equivalent to Aphrodite in their culture. Herodotus records that a similar practice or custom took place within Cyprus, with girls offering themselves up for sex as required by the rites of Aphrodite. Ennius and Ovid corroborate each other on the idea that Aphrodite established the act of prostitution within the city of Cyprus.

A temple of Kition also shows evidence of sacred prostitution. On a marble plaque, it lists out sacred prostitutes among other professions (bakers, scribes, barbers) that were part of ritual personnel at some Cypriot temples.

Temple of Aphaca 
The temple of Aphaca may be another source of evidence for temple prostitution. The process is similar to regular prostitution, where male customers paid two or three obol in the form of or in addition to dedications to Aphrodite in exchange for sex with a temple prostitute. In the temple of Aphaca specifically, the men would dedicate their payment to "Cyprian Aphrodite" before engaging in sex with a temple prostitute.

Ancient Rome and late antiquity

Ancient Rome

Late antiquity
The Roman emperor Constantine closed down a number of temples to Venus or similar deities in the 4th century AD, as the Christian church historian Eusebius proudly noted. Eusebius also claimed that the Phoenician cities of Aphaca and Heliopolis (Baalbek) continued to practise temple prostitution until the emperor Constantine put an end to the rite in the 4th century AD.

Asia

India

Some parts of Indian state have the practice of hierodulic prostitution, with similar customary forms such as basavi, and involves dedicating pre-pubescent and young adolescent girls from villages in a ritual marriage to a Hindu deity or a Hindu temple, who then work in the temple and function as spiritual guides, dancers, and prostitutes servicing male devotees in the temple. The devadasis were originally seen as intercessors who allowed upper-caste men to have contact with the gods. Though they did develop sexual relations with other men, they were not looked upon with lust. Before Muslim rule in the 14th century, they could live an existence apart from the men, with inheritance rights, wealth and influence, as well as living outside of the dangers of marriage.

The system was criticised by British colonial government while defended by Brahmins, leading to a decline in support for the system and the devadasis soon turned to prostitution. Many scholars have stated that the Hindu scriptures do not mention the system. Human Rights Watch also reports claim that devadasis are forced into this service and, at least in some cases, to practice prostitution for upper-caste members. Various state governments in India enacted laws to ban this practice both prior to India's independence and more recently. They include Bombay Devdasi Act, 1934, Devdasi (Prevention of dedication) Madras Act, 1947, Karnataka Devdasi (Prohibition of dedication) Act, 1982, and Andhra Pradesh Devdasi (Prohibition of dedication) Act, 1988. However, the tradition continues in certain regions of India, particularly the states of Karnataka and Andhra Pradesh.

Japan
While aruki miko primarily provided religious services, they were also widely associated with prostitution. However, no religious reasons for miko prostitution are known, and hence the act might be unrelated to sacred prostitution.

Indonesia

Mesoamerica and South America

Maya
The Maya maintained several phallic religious cults, possibly involving homosexual temple prostitution.

Aztec
Much evidence for the religious practices of the Aztec culture was destroyed during the Spanish conquest, and almost the only evidence for the practices of their religion is from Spanish accounts. The Franciscan Spanish Friar Bernardino de Sahagún learned their language and spent more than 50 years studying the culture. He wrote that they participated in religious festivals and rituals, as well as performing sexual acts as part of religious practice. This may be evidence for the existence of sacred prostitution in Mesoamerica, or it may be either confusion, or accusational polemic. He also speaks of kind of prostitutes named ahuianime ("pleasure girls"), whom he described as "an evil woman who finds pleasure in her body... [A] dissolute woman of debauched life."

It is agreed that the Aztec god Xochipili (taken from both Toltec and Maya cultures) was both the patron of homosexuals and homosexual prostitutes. Xochiquetzal was worshiped as goddess of sexual power, patroness of prostitutes and artisans involved in the manufacture of luxury items.

Inca
The Inca sometimes dedicated young boys as temple prostitutes.  The boys were dressed in girl's clothing, and chiefs and head men would have ritual sexual intercourse with them during religious ceremonies and on holy days.

Recent Western occurrences
In the 1970s and early 1980s, some religious cults practised sacred prostitution as an instrument to recruit new converts. Among them was the cult Children of God, also known as The Family, who called this practice "Flirty Fishing". They later abolished the practice due to the growing AIDS epidemic.

In Ventura County, California, Wilbur and Mary Ellen Tracy established their own temple, the Church Of The Most High Goddess, in the wake of what they described as a divine revelation. Sexual acts played a fundamental role in the church's sacred rites, which were performed by Mary Ellen Tracy herself in her assumed role of High Priestess. Local newspaper articles about the Neopagan church quickly got the attention of local law enforcement officials, and in April 1989, the Tracys' house was searched and the couple arrested on charges of pimping, pandering and prostitution. They were subsequently convicted in a trial in state court and sentenced to jail terms: Wilbur Tracy for 180 days plus a $1,000.00 fine; Mary Ellen Tracy for 90 days plus mandatory screening for STDs.

Some modern sacred prostitutes act as sexual surrogates as a form of therapy. In places where prostitution is illegal, sacred prostitutes may be paid as therapists, escorts, or performers.

Modern views
According to Avaren Ipsen, from University of California, Berkeley's Commission on the Status of Women, the myth of sacred prostitution works as "an enormous source of self-esteem and as a model of sex positivity" to many sex workers. She compared this situation to the figure of Mary Magdalene, whose status as a prostitute, though short-lived according to Christian texts and disputed among academics, has been celebrated by sex working collectives (among them Sex Workers Outreach Project USA) in an effort to de-stigmatize their job. Ipsen speculated that academic currents trying to deny sacred prostitution are ideologically motivated, attributing them to the "desires of feminists, including myself, to be 'decent.'"

In her book The Sacred Prostitute: Eternal Aspect of the Feminine, psychoanalyst Nancy Qualls-Corbett praised sacred prostitution as an expression of female sexuality and a bridge between the latter and the divine, as well as a rupture from mundane sexual degradation. "[The sacred prostitute] did not make love in order to obtain admiration or devotion from the man who came to her... She did not require a man to give her a sense of her own identity; rather this was rooted in her own womanliness." Qualls also equated censuring sacred prostitution to demonize female sexuality and vitality. "In her temple, men and women came to find life and all that it had to offer in sensual pleasure and delight. But with the change in cultural values and the institutionalization of monotheism and patriarchy, the individual came to the House of God to prepare for death."

This opinion is shared by several schools of modern Paganism. among them Wicca, for whom sacred prostitution, independently from its historical backing, embodies the sacralization of sex and a celebration of the communion between female and male sexuality. This practice is associated to spiritual healing and sex magic. Within secular thinking, philosopher Antonio Escohotado is a popular adept of this current, favoring particularly the role of ancient sacred prostitutes and priestesses of Ishtar. In his seminal work Rameras y esposas, he extols them and their cult as symbols of female empowerment and sexual freedom.

Actress Susie Lamb approached sacred prostitution in her 2014 performance Horae: Fragments of a Sacred History of Prostitution, in which she points out its value to challenge gender roles. "The idea of sacred prostitution is almost entirely incomprehensible to the modern imagination. It involved women having sex as an act of worship... The relationship between men and women in this ancient tradition is based on respect for the woman. She was seen as a powerful person."

See also 

Deuki
Devadasi
Hetaera
Shamhat
Sex worker
Sex magic
Primitive promiscuity
Hijra (South Asia)
Sexuality in ancient Rome
List of fertility deities
List of love and lust deities
Padre Putas

References

Bibliography

 
 
 
 
 
 
 
 
 
 
 
 
 
 
  Published in 12 volumes

External links
Stuckey, H. Johanna. "Sacred Prostitutes".   MatriFocus. 2005 vol 5–1.
, and a discussion
Jenin Younes (2008), Sacred Prostitution in Ancient Israel

Prostitution
Religious sex rituals
Prostitution
Religious occupations
Ancient priestesses
Sexual controversies
Holiness
History of prostitution
Inanna